Football Club Olympique Strasbourg Koenigshoffen 1906, known as Strasbourg Koenigshoffen or FCOSK 06, is a football club based in the  and  districts of Strasbourg, France. Founded in 1906, the club plays its home matches at the Stade Charles Frey. The club's colours are black and gold.

FCOSK 06 played in the Division 3 in the 1970s and 80s. The club has notably reached the round of 64 of the Coupe de France on several occasions. Didier Six coached Koenigshoffen from 1997 to 1998, and Pascal Malbeaux has served as the club's head coach and president.

Honours

References 

Football clubs in Strasbourg
Association football clubs established in 1906
1906 establishments in Germany
Football clubs in France
Football clubs from former German territories